The 1979 U.S. National Indoor Championships was a men's tennis tournament played on indoor carpet courts at the Racquet Club of Memphis in Memphis, Tennessee in the United States. The event was part of the 1979 Colgate-Palmolive Grand Prix circuit. It was the tenth edition of the tournament in the open era and was held from February 26 through March 4, 1979. First-seeded Jimmy Connors won the singles title and $40,000 first-prize money. It was his fifth singles title at the event after 1973–75 and 1978 which equaled the tournament record set by Wylie C. Grant.

Finals

Singles
 Jimmy Connors defeated  Arthur Ashe 6–4, 5–7, 6–3
 It was Connors' 3rd singles title of the year and the 74th of his career.

Doubles
 Tom Okker /  Wojciech Fibak defeated  Frew McMillan /  Dick Stockton 6–4, 6–4

Notes

References

External links
 ITF tournament details

U.S. National Indoor Tennis Championships
U.S. National Indoor Championships
U.S. National Indoor Tennis Championships
U.S. National Indoor Tennis Championships
U.S. National Indoor Tennis Championships
U.S. National Indoor Tennis Championships